Mike Hermann is an American football quarterback who is currently a free agent. He played college football at Rensselaer Polytechnic Institute.

Early years
Mike ( Michael Alexander) Hermann was born in Australia of an American father and a New Zealand Maori mother. He came to the United States as an infant. He was a standout at Hilton Head Prep school in basketball and football. He also attended Avon Old Farms school for his post year of high school where he played football and basketball. He attended and played for Rensselaer Polytechnic Institute from 2009 to 2013. He was named offensive player of the year of Liberty League in 2011 and 2012.

Professional career
On May 3, 2013, Hermann signed with the San Diego Chargers as an undrafted free agent. Hermann was later cut by the San Diego Chargers.

References

External links
 

American football quarterbacks
San Diego Chargers players
Living people
Year of birth missing (living people)
Avon Old Farms alumni
Rensselaer Polytechnic Institute alumni